Alexander I (called "of Jülich";) was the prince-bishop of Liège from 1128 to 1134.

As bishop, he received Pope Innocent II, Emperor Lothair II, and Bernard of Clairvaux. As prince, he was a warrior, taking part in the wars of Waleran, Duke of Lower Lorraine against Godfrey I of Leuven.

Sources

12th-century Prince-Bishops of Liège
1134 deaths
Prince-Bishops of Liège
Year of birth unknown